Wilderness Press is a publisher of outdoor guidebooks and maps that was founded in Berkeley, California in 1967. Its first publication was Sierra North (1967/2005). Reissued in 2005, this is considered the authoritative guidebook for hikers and backpackers in the Northern Sierra Nevada.

Since the debut of Sierra North in 1967, Wilderness Press has become well known for its outdoor titles, guidebooks, and maps. It has been owned by Keen Communications since 2008, and headquarters have moved to Birmingham, Alabama.

Select bibliography
Walking Brooklyn

References

External links
 

Book publishing companies based in Berkeley, California
Map publishing companies
Publishing companies established in 1967
Mass media in Birmingham, Alabama
Companies based in Birmingham, Alabama
1967 establishments in California